Sergey Petrosyan (June 7, 1988 – July 26, 2017) was an Azerbaijani-Russian weightlifter of Armenian descent.

Petrosyan participated in the European Weightlifting Championships of 2007 and 2008, and won gold in both years.

See also 
2007 European Weightlifting Championships
2008 European Weightlifting Championships

External links
 Profile on Chidlovski.net

References

1988 births
2017 deaths
Sportspeople from Baku
Russian male weightlifters
Russian people of Armenian descent
Deaths by drowning
European Weightlifting Championships medalists